NOTT-202 is a two-part chemical compound that is capable of selectively absorbing carbon dioxide.  It is a metal–organic framework (MOF) that functions like a sponge, adsorbing selected gases at high pressures. Its creation was announced by scientists in 2012. The researchers claimed this structure was an entirely new class of porous material.

References

Carbon capture and storage
Metal-organic frameworks
Indium compounds